The All-Ireland Senior Club Football Championship is an annual Gaelic football tournament which began in season 1970–71. It is the top-tier competition for the senior football clubs of Ireland and London.

The current champions are Kilmacud Crokes of Dublin who defeated Glen of Derry on 22 January 2023 to win their third title. 

The current trophy is the Andy Merrigan Cup, named after a footballer who played for Castletown Liam Mellows and Wexford who died as a result of a farm accident at the height of his playing career. It was first presented in 1974.

Competition format
County Championships
Ireland's 32 counties play their county championships between their senior Gaelic football clubs. Each county decides the format for determining their county champions. The format can be knockout, double-elimination, league, etc. or a combination. For instance, Kerry organise two separate championships - one for clubs only and one for clubs and divisional sides. 

Provincial Championships
Connacht, Leinster, Munster and Ulster each organise a provincial championship for their participating county champions. All matches are knock-out and two ten minute periods of extra time are played if it's a draw at the end of normal time.

All-Ireland Championship
The four provincial winners advance to the semi-finals. Until the 2018-19 competition, the London Senior Football Champion would play one of the provincial champions in a Quarter Final in December with the winner advancing to the All Ireland Semi Final. The All-Ireland final was traditionally played in Croke Park on St. Patrick's Day, 17 March.

In an attempt to shorten the season for club players, the semi-finals and final were brought forward for the 2019–20 season.  The semi finals were played on the first weekend in January with the final scheduled for 19 January.

Traditional Typical Schedule
County championships – April to November
Provincial championships – October to December
All-Ireland quarter-final – mid-December or January
All-Ireland semi-finals – mid-February
All-Ireland final – 17 March in Croke Park, Dublin

History
Ulster and Connacht tournaments were first held in the 1960s and the first unofficial All-Ireland Final took place in 1968. The final was contested by Dunmore McHales of Galway and St Josephs of Donegal. It was a two leg affair with St Josephs emerging as the winners. The motion was then brought to the GAA National Congress in 1969. Despite opposition from many delegations the motion received the necessary two-thirds majority.

The first winners in 1970–71 were an East Kerry divisional team (nowadays amalgamations of clubs are not allowed to enter the All-Ireland). In the following year, Bellaghy from Derry, became the first individual club to win the All-Ireland Club Championship by defeating UCC of Cork in the final at Croke Park.

The Andy Merrigan Cup was first awarded in 1974, donated by the Castletown Liam Mellows club in memory of the great Wexford footballer who died in a farming accident at the height of his career.

Dublin clubs (UCD x2 and St Vincent's of Marino) won three-in-a-row All-Irelands in 1974–76, before Kerry and Cork clubs began to dominate, winning 9 titles in 13 years, 1977–89, including four for Nemo Rangers of Cork. Clann na nGael won 7 Connacht titles in 8 years (1983–90), but did not win a single All-Ireland.

St Mary's Burren of Down ended a 14-year Ulster drought when they were victorious in 1986. Baltinglass caused a major shock in 1990 by winning their and Wicklow's first national honour, while Nemo pulled ahead with their fifth title in 1994. In 1998, Corofin won Galway's and Connacht's first national award, six months before the county team's first All-Ireland for 32 years.

In the late 1990s the club championship rose to national prominence with regular TV coverage and the prestigious St Patrick's Day fixture in Croke Park for the final. Crossmaglen Rangers claimed 3 All-Irelands in 4 years from 1997 to 2000. While the Caltra club of Galway won their first Galway title, first Connacht award and first All-Ireland in one year, 2003–04. 2006 saw Salthill-Knocknacarra of Galway complete a Connacht three-in-a-row.

In 2010, St Gall's in Antrim beat Kilmurry-Ibrickane of Clare to win their first title.

In 2023, Kilmacud Crokes defeated Glen by 1-11 to 1-09 to win their third title. However Kilmacud Crokes finished the game with an extra player on the pitch, causing significant controversy. The GAA ordered a replay of the final after Glen lodged an objection. However after Kilmacud Crokes lodged an appeal against a replay, Glen withdrew from the appeals process, saying that they "do not believe the conditions exist for a replay", resulting in Kilmacud retaining their title.

List of Finals

Summary of All-Ireland champions

By club

By county

L, M, U, C refer to Leinster/Munster/Ulster/Connacht championships won by clubs from the county. "Most recent winning team" gives the name of the club from the county which last won the All-Ireland; if no club has, the name of the last provincial champion is given in italic type.

No club from Cavan, Fermanagh, Kilkenny, Leitrim, London, Louth, Waterford or Wexford has ever won a national or provincial title.

By province

List of provincial champions
All-Ireland winners are shaded gold, and counties are given in brackets.

See also
 All-Ireland Intermediate Club Football Championship
 All-Ireland Junior Club Football Championship
 All-Ireland Senior Club Hurling Championship
 All-Ireland Senior Football Championship

References

External links
 2006 Results from Setanta.com/ie
 List of GAA Clubs Online
 "Flashback: five great St Patrick's Day Club SFC finals", Hogan Stand, 17 March 2021

 
Senior